Daniel Orac (born 6 April 1985) is a former Romanian professional footballer who played as a winger. He played 115 times in Liga I, and also played in the Greek Super League for Panthrakikos. His uncle is Costel Orac who was also a footballer.

Club career

Pandurii Târgu Jiu
After an unsuccessful year at Universitatea Craiova Orac joined Pandurii Târgu Jiu. After a falling out with manager Sorin Cârţu he was first loaned to CSM Râmnicu Vâlcea and the then terminated his contract.

Panthrakikos
Orac played for Panthrakikos F.C. in the Greek Super League in season 2009–2010.

Return to Pandurii
He returned to Pandurii Târgu Jiu after just one year away.

CSMS Iași
In July 2011 Orac joined Liga II side CSMS Iași due to a close relationship with manager Marius Baciu.

References

External links
 
 
 

1985 births
Living people
FC Steaua București players
FC U Craiova 1948 players
Romanian footballers
ASC Oțelul Galați players
Panthrakikos F.C. players
CS Pandurii Târgu Jiu players
SCM Râmnicu Vâlcea players
Expatriate footballers in Greece
Liga I players
FC Politehnica Iași (2010) players
Association football midfielders